Frankie Lor Fu Chuen is a Hong Kong horse racing trainer and former jockey.

Career

As jockey
Lor began his racing career as a jockey. He won 27 races between 1981 and 1995. He became work rider and later assistant to various trainers, among them John Moore and John Size.

As Trainer
Frankie Lor got his licence as a trainer in 2017. The end of his first training season (2017–2018) saw him in second place in the trainer's championship. At 17 March 2019, Lor won the Hong Kong Derby with Furore and so became the first Chinese trainer to win the Derby since 2001.

References

1966 births
Living people
Hong Kong jockeys
Hong Kong horse trainers